"Rest of My Life" is a song by American hip hop recording artist Ludacris, featuring Usher and David Guetta. It was released November 2, 2012 in promotion of his ninth studio album, Ludaversal, which was released on 31 March 2015.

Background
These three artists have had previous collaborations between them. Ludacris and Usher collaborated with Lil' Jon on the songs "Yeah!" (heard on Usher's Confessions album) and "Lovers and Friends" (heard on Lil' Jon's Crunk Juice album). Usher was also featured on Guetta's 2011 smash hit single "Without You", on Guetta's album, Nothing but the Beat. Ludacris and Guetta also collaborated with Taio Cruz on the single "Little Bad Girl", also heard on Nothing but the Beat.

Composition
All three artists co-wrote the song with 112 member Slim, Giorgio Tuinfort, and Play-N-Skillz, while production was handled by Guetta and Tuinfort. The song's instrumental hook is similar to that of Afrojack's "Can't Stop Me".

Release
The song was released on November 2, 2012, originally as the third single from Ludacris' ninth studio album, Ludaversal, but like the singles "Jingalin" and "Representin", it wasn't included on the album for unknown reasons.  It was, however, featured in the movie Fast & Furious 6 and its soundtrack in which Bridges stars in. The song was heard in TV advertisements for the 2013 movie Battle of the Year. The song was also featured on the compilation album, Now That's What I Call Music! 46.

Music video
A music video to accompany the release of "Rest of My Life" was first released onto YouTube on 11 November 2012 at a total length of four minutes and seven seconds. Los Angeles Clippers point guard Chris Paul and duo Lipari Brothers makes an appearance in the video.

Track listing

Charts and certifications

Weekly charts

Year-end charts

Certifications

Release history

References

2012 singles
Ludacris songs
Songs written by Giorgio Tuinfort
Songs written by Ludacris
2012 songs
Def Jam Recordings singles
Songs written by David Guetta
Songs written by Afrojack
Songs written by Usher (musician)
Songs written by Slim (singer)
Song recordings produced by David Guetta